National parks of Ireland can refer to:
National Parks in the Republic of Ireland
National parks of Northern Ireland